East District is a district in east Hsinchu City, Taiwan. It is the second largest of the three districts in Hsinchu City. The East District is home to the Hsinchu Science and Industrial Park.

Geography
 Area: 
 Population: 222,013 (February 2023)

Administrative divisions
The district consists of Nanmen, Fude, Nanshi, Guandi, Tungmen, Rongguang, Chenggong, Xiazhu, Zhulian, Siqian, Yuxian, Zhongzheng, Gongyuan, Dingzhu, Nanda, Zhenxing, Qinren, Wenhua, Fuzhong, Sanmin, Tungyuan, Tungshi, Guangfu, Fenggong, Wugong, Lushui, Tungshan, Guangzhen, Xinxing, Zhaiqiao, Gaofeng, Xiangong, Guangming, Ligong, Jungong, Jiangong, Qianxi, Shuiyuan, Qianjia, Puding, Longshan, Xinzhuang, Xianshui, Jinshan, Guantung, Keyuan, Jianhua, Xinguang, Fuxing, Jinhua, Hubin, Minghu and Guanxin Village.

Government institutions
 National Synchrotron Radiation Research Center
 National Space Organization
 National Applied Research Laboratories

Education

Universities
 National Yang Ming Chiao Tung University
 National Tsing Hua University

High schools
 Hsinchu American School
 Hsinchu Pei Ying Junior High School
 National Hsinchu Girls' Senior High School
 National Hsinchu Senior High School
 International Bilingual School at Hsinchu Science Park

Tourist attractions
 18 Peaks Mountain Park
 Aqueduct Museum of Hsinchu City
 Black Bat Squadron Memorial Hall
 Cheng Huang Temple
 Glass Museum of Hsinchu City
 Green Grass Lake
 Guan Di Temple
 Gu Qi Feng Cultural Museum
 Hsinchu City Art Site of Railway Warehouse
 Hsinchu Taiwan Pavilion Expo Park
 Hsinchu Zoo
 Image Museum of Hsinchu City
 Jin Shan Temple
 Jinshi Mansion
 Lake Placid
 Lee Tze-fan Memorial Art Gallery
 National Hsinchu Living Arts Center

Transportation

Rail

The Taiwan Railway Administration serves East District via four stations: Hsinchu, North Hsinchu, Shibo and Xinzhuang. Taiwan High Speed Rail also passes through the eastern part of East District, but no station is currently planned.

Road

Bus station in the district is Hsinchu Bus Station of Hsinchu Bus.

References

Districts of Hsinchu